Piersanti is both an Italian surname and a masculine Italian given name. Notable people with the name include:

Surname:
Cactus Pete Piersanti (1916–1994), American businessman
Franco Piersanti (born 1950), Italian composer and conductor
Umberto Piersanti (born 1941), Italian poet and writer

Given name:
Piersanti Mattarella (1935–1980), Italian politician

Italian-language surnames
Italian masculine given names